The Hunter Eagles were formed for the ABL 1994-95 season after purchasing the Sydney Wave's licence, who had left the league two seasons earlier. The Eagles played in the ABL until the ABL 1997-98 season, and did not have sufficient funds to remain in operation.

A ~1998 proposal to redevelop the Cardiff Sports Centre in Ada St, Cardiff never came to fruition.

The Hunter Eagles expected to return to ABL competition after the completion of the new Gosford stadium in 1999, But with the collapse of the ABL it did not eventuate.

History

See also 
Sport in Australia
Australian Baseball
Australian Baseball League (1989–1999)

Sources
 http://www.pflintoff.com/AMLBHIST.htm

External links
The Australian Baseball League: 1989–1999

Australian Baseball League (1989–1999) teams
Defunct baseball teams in Australia